Bluewater Bay, Florida is a planned community in Okaloosa County, Florida, United States.

External links
Map of Bluewater Bay FL
Bluewater Bay FL website
Municipal Services Benefit Unit (MSBU) website

Unincorporated communities in Okaloosa County, Florida
Golf clubs and courses in Florida
Planned communities in Florida